KNBU (89.7 FM; "The Edge") was a non-profit educational radio station licensed to Baldwin City, Kansas, United States. The station was owned and operated by Baker University.

KNBU signed on November 29, 1965. On April 20, 2017, Baker University informed the Federal Communications Commission (FCC) that it would surrender the KNBU license effective May 15; on April 28, the FCC canceled the station's license.

References

External links

NBU
NBU
Radio stations established in 1965
1965 establishments in Kansas
Radio stations disestablished in 2017
2017 disestablishments in Kansas
Defunct radio stations in the United States
Baker University
NBU